Newton number may refer to:
 The kissing number in the sphere packing problem
 The power number Np in Physics as a dimensionless number relating the resistance force to the inertia force.